Mammillaria pringlei, called the lemon ball, is a species of cactus in the genus Mammillaria, native to Mexico, from Querétaro through to Veracruz and on to México State. It has gained the Royal Horticultural Society's Award of Garden Merit.

References

pringlei
Endemic flora of Mexico
Flora of Central Mexico
Flora of Northeastern Mexico
Flora of Veracruz
Plants described in 1900